Super may refer to:

Computing 
 SUPER (computer program), or Simplified Universal Player Encoder & Renderer, a video converter / player
 Super (computer science), a keyword in object-oriented programming languages
 Super key (keyboard button)

Film and television 
 Super (2005 film), a Telugu film starring Nagarjuna, Anushka Shetty and Ayesha Takia
 Super (2010 Indian film), a Kannada language film starring Upendra and Nayantara
 Super (2010 American film), a film written and directed by James Gunn, and starring Rainn Wilson and Elliot Page
 "Super" (Person of Interest), an episode of the TV series Person of Interest

Music 
 "Super" (Cordae song), a 2021 song by American rapper Cordae
 "Super" (Neu! song), a 1972 song by German band Neu!
 "Super (1, 2, 3)", a 2000 song by Italian DJ Gigi D'Agostino
 Super (album), a 2016 album by Pet Shop Boys

Other uses 
 Super!, an Italian television network
 Super (gamer) (born 2000), American professional Overwatch player
 Building superintendent or super, a manager, maintenance or repair person, custodian, or janitor
 Superannuation in Australia or super
 Supernumerary actor or super, the stage equivalent of an extra in film
  or SuPer, Finnish Union of Practical Nurses
 Zab Judah or Super, American boxer
 .38 Super or super, a pistol cartridge
 The "Super", Teller's H-bomb idea, a thermonuclear fusion bomb ignited by a smaller fission bomb

See also
 Honey super, the part of a commercial beehive that is used to collect honey
 Super unleaded, a grade of gasoline
 Extraordinary (disambiguation)
 Supra (disambiguation)